The men's 5000 metres at the 2014 World Junior Championships in Athletics was held at Hayward Field on 25 July.

Medalists

Records

Results

Final

References

External links
 WJC14 5000 metres schedule

5000 metres
Long distance running at the World Athletics U20 Championships